2F may refer to:

 2F, the hexadecimal code (in ASCII and Unicode) for the slash character
 2F-Spiele, a German publisher of board games located in Bremen
 Apartment 2F, a 1997 MTV sitcom
 Long March 2F, a Chinese rocket
 Transcription factor II F in biochemistry

See also
 F2 (disambiguation)